The Jagdpanzer MOWAG Cheetah is a Jagdpanzer (tank hunter) made by Mowag in Switzerland.

History and development
In 1960, the West German Bundeswehr started a development project with the purpose of creating a new casemate tank destroyer armed with the 90mm anti-tank gun from their obsolete M47 Patton tanks. Three different proposals were offered by the companies Henschel, Hanomag and Mowag. Each company completed a single prototype for a comparison test. The Bundeswehr eventually chose the Hanomag prototype and put it into production as the Kanonenjagdpanzer. Built in early 1960, the MOWAG Cheetah has air conditioning, NBC protection, and an automatic fire detection and extinguishing system in the engine compartment. The only prototype is now in the Military Museum Full.

References 

Armoured fighting vehicles of Switzerland
Tank destroyers
Abandoned military projects of Switzerland